Christopher M. Rabb (born February 21, 1970) is an American politician, professor, and author. A Democrat, he is a member of the Pennsylvania House of Representatives, representing the 200th District since 2017. In a heavily Democratic district where winning the primary is tantamount to winning the election, he defeated the incumbent, who had the support of the Democratic establishment, in 2016.

Early life and education 
Rabb was born in Chicago, to an ophthalmologist and professor father, Maurice Rabb Jr., and a politically active mother, Madeline Murphy Rabb. His maternal grandmother Madeline Wheeler Murphy, was a Baltimore-based community activist, and his maternal grandfather, William H. Murphy Sr, was a judge in Baltimore Rabb's great-great-grandfather, John H. Murphy Sr., was born a slave and founded the Baltimore Afro-American in 1892. Shortly after beginning his undergraduate education at Yale in 1988, Rabb was instrumental in the removal of an image of a shackled slave from the common room of Calhoun College (named after alumnus John C. Calhoun), in the process Rabb also learned he was a descendant of Philip Livingston. Rabb received his bachelor's degree from Yale in 1992. Rabb got a master's degree in Organizational Dynamics from the University of Pennsylvania in 2006.

Career
In the early 90s Rabb worked as an aide to former U.S. Senator Carol Moseley Braun. He then worked for the Clinton administration in the 1995 White House Conference on Small Business. Since moving to Philadelphia to obtain his master's at Penn, he has taught a business course at Temple University. He published the non-fiction book Invisible Capital: How Unseen Forces Shape Entrepreneurial Opportunity in 2010.

Pennsylvania House of Representatives
In 2016, Rabb defeated the incumbent Tonyelle Cook-Artis in a three-way Democratic primary 47% to 40%, and then defeated Republican challenger Latryse McDowell 94% to 5% in the November general election. He won the 2018 primary over challenger Melissa Scott 52%-48%, and has run unopposed since.

Vasectomy memo
On October 2, 2021, Rabb authored a memo to all members of the Pennsylvania House of Representatives indicating that he will be introducing legislation to enforce reproductive responsibility among men. According to the memo, the proposal would "require all inseminators to undergo vasectomies within 6 weeks from having their third child or 40th birthday, whichever comes first." Rabb's satirical memo draws attention to the double-standard of regulating women's bodies via legislation while the equivalent bill affecting cisgender men would seem absurd. Rabb called the memo "parody legislation".

Committees 
 Agriculture & Rural Affairs, Democratic Vice Chair 
 Commerce, Subcommittee on Financial Services and Banking - Democratic Chair 
 Finance, Democratic Secretary 
 Judiciary

Personal life 
Rabb has two sons and lives in East Mount Airy.

Published works
 Invisible Capital: How Unseen Forces Shape Entrepreneurial Opportunity (2010)

References

External links
Profile at PA House website
Profile at Project Vote Smart website
Profile at Pennsylvania House Democratic Caucus website

Democratic Party members of the Pennsylvania House of Representatives
Living people
1970 births
Murphy family
African-American state legislators in Pennsylvania
21st-century American politicians
21st-century African-American politicians
20th-century African-American people
Yale University alumni
University of Pennsylvania alumni